Gun-launched missiles, a subset of cannon-launched guided projectiles, are usually anti-tank guided missiles that are fired from tank guns, and sometimes have a claimed limited anti-helicopter capability.
 Chinese GP105 fired from 105 mm gun
 French  (ACRA) 142mm anti-tank guided missile, tested on a version of the AMX-30 MBT
 Indian SAMHO (missile) fired from 120 mm gun
 Israeli LAHAT, used with their 105 and 120 mm gun tubes
 Russian 9K112 Kobra (AT-8 Songster), 9M119/M/120 (Refleks/Refleks-M/Svir) (AT-11 Sniper) and other types, fired from 100, 115, and 125 mm guns
 Ukrainian  tandem-warhead ATGM with a 5,000 m effective range, fired from a 125 mm smoothbore gun
 US Army MGM-51 Shillelagh fired from a 152 mm gun
 XM1111 Mid-Range Munition (guided round, no rocket motor)
 Ukraine-developed Falarick 90, 105, and 120 mm with a 4000–5000 m range (depending on the calibre) ATGM for Cockerill guns made by the Belgian arms manufacturer CMI Defence

References

Armoured warfare
Missile types
Anti-tank guided missiles